First Presbyterian Church, Leavenworth is a historic Presbyterian church at 407 Walnut Street in Leavenworth, Kansas.  It was designed by architect William Pratt Feth and built in 1907–09.

It was added to the National Register of Historic Places in 2006.

It is a Classical Revival-style brick building, with brick laid in stretcher bond. It has an Ionic portico.

References

Presbyterian churches in Kansas
Churches on the National Register of Historic Places in Kansas
Neoclassical architecture in Kansas
Churches completed in 1907
Buildings and structures in Leavenworth, Kansas
National Register of Historic Places in Leavenworth County, Kansas
Neoclassical church buildings in the United States